Mushroom Rock State Park is noted for its mushroom rock formations.  It is located in the Smoky Hills region of north-central Kansas in Ellsworth County, Kansas, United States.  

These rocks are the remains of beach sands and sediments of the Cretaceous Period, the interval of geologic time from about 144 to 66 million years ago. Sandstone and sedimentary rock is held together by natural cement. The concretions that make up Mushroom Rocks are cemented calcium carbonate. The largest rock measures 27 feet in diameter. There are two mushrooms and a giant shoe rock, as well as numerous other rock formations in the  park. 

Mushroom Rock is Kansas's smallest state park. As well as being "one of the 8 wonders of Kansas Geography." Mushroom Rock State Park is managed by Kanopolis State Park, under regulation of Kansas Department of Wildlife, Parks and Tourism. The rock used to serve as meeting places for pioneers and Native Americans.

Gallery

See also
Other rock formations in Kansas:
 Castle Rock (Kansas)
 Monument Rocks (Kansas)
 Rock City, Kansas

References

External links
 Mushroom Rock State Park - Official Site
 Mushroom Rock State Park - Trip Report
 Mushroom Rock State Park - Photographs
 Ellsworth County map, KDOT

Protected areas of Ellsworth County, Kansas
Tourist attractions in Ellsworth County, Kansas
State parks of Kansas
Rock formations of Kansas
Protected areas established in 1965
Landforms of Ellsworth County, Kansas